Sodium- and chloride-dependent glycine transporter 2, also known as glycine transporter 2 (GlyT2), is a protein that in humans is encoded by the SLC6A5 gene.

The glycine transporter 2 is a membrane protein which recaptures glycine, a major inhibitory transmitter in the spinal cord and brainstem.  GlyT2 is a specific marker of glycinergic neurons and a member of the Na+ and Cl−-coupled transporter family SLC6. Glycine uptake mediated by GlyT2 is electrogenic, coupled to three Na+ and one Cl− (i.e. two positive charges per glycine). In humans, GlyT2 is encoded by the SLC6A5 gene. Inactivation of GlyT2 in knockout mice is lethal during the second post-natal week as the absence of GlyT2 disrupts inhibitory transmission by reducing glycine release. Mutations in SLC6A5 gene are responsible for a presynaptic form of hyperekplexia, a genetic disease causing increased startle reflex. GlyT2 main physiological role is to recapture glycine released in the synaptic cleft and to maintain high glycine concentration in the presynaptic neuron. Therefore, chronic inhibition of GlyT2 will deplete intracellular storage of glycine and limit its accumulation in synaptic vesicles.

Inhibitors
 Amoxapine
 Ethanol
 N-Arachidonylglycine (NAGly)
 Opiranserin (VVZ-149)
 ORG-25543
 VVZ-368

See also
 Sodium:neurotransmitter symporter
 Solute carrier family

References

Further reading

Solute carrier family